A Danish passport is an identity document issued to citizens of the Kingdom of Denmark to facilitate international travel. Besides serving as proof of Danish citizenship, they facilitate the process of securing assistance from Danish consular officials abroad (or other EU consulates or Nordic missions in case a Danish consular official is absent).

Different versions exist for nationals of Denmark, Greenland, and the Faroe Islands although they do not indicate a different nationality, with all holders being Danish citizens. Danish nationals residing in Greenland can choose between the Danish—EU passport and the sub-national Danish-—Greenlandic passport.

Every Danish citizen (except for nationals residing in the Faroe Islands) is also a citizen of the European Union. The passport entitles its bearer to freedom of movement in the European Economic Area and Switzerland. For travel within the Nordic countries no identity documentation is legally required for Nordic citizens due to the Nordic Passport Union.

According to the April 2021 Visa Restrictions Index, Danish citizens can visit 189 countries without a visa or with a visa granted on arrival.

Physical appearance
The Danish and Greenlandic versions of the passport have burgundy colour covers, according to the European Union's recommendations, while the Faroese-Danish version is green. All contain the National Coat of arms of Denmark emblazoned in the centre of the front cover, with the word DANMARK (Denmark) above it, and the word PAS (Passport) below. Since 1 August 2006, biometric passports are issued.
Above the word DANMARK, the Danish version contains the words DEN EUROPÆISKE UNION (European Union) (as all other EU passports), while in the Greenlandic and Faroese versions the text KALAALLIT NUNAAT (Greenland) or FØROYAR (Faroe Islands) is written. Fields on the bearer's page are in Danish, English, and French, with translations in the official languages of the European Union elsewhere in the document. Instead of French, Faroese or Greenlandic are used in the Faroese and Greenlandic versions respectively. The page contains the following information:
 Photo of the passport holder
 Type (P)
 Passport No.
 Surname
 Given names
 Sex
 Nationality (Danish)
 In a Faroe passport the following: Dansk/Danskur/Danish-Færøsk/Føroyskur/Faroese
 In the Greenlandic passport the first page is in Greenlandic, Danish, and English, and the text on pages 1 and 2 are not in so many different languages, as in the Danish
 Height
 Date of Birth
 Personal Code Number
 Place of Birth
 Date of issue/expiry (validity is 10 years from date of issue for adults and 5 years for children)
 Authority (usually the municipality in which the holder resides)
 Holder's signature

Passports contain a machine readable strip starting with P>DNK for all types.

Different spellings of the same name 

Names containing letters not used in English (æ, ø, å) are spelled the correct way in the non-machine-readable zone, but are mapped in the machine-readable zone, æ becoming AE, ø becoming OE, and å becoming AA. This follows the international machine-readable passport standard.

For example, Gråbøl → GRAABOEL.

Types
Besides the ordinary passport (with PAS on the cover), also 3 versions of blue service passports (TJENESTEPAS) and a single red diplomatic passport (DIPLOMATPAS) are issued. The latter does not bear the text DEN EUROPÆISKE UNION, KALAALLIT NUNAAT nor FØROYAR.

Visa requirements

As of 21 September 2022, Danish citizens had visa-free or visa on arrival access to 188 countries and territories, thus ranking the Danish passport fifth in the world (tied with the passports of Austria, the Netherlands, and Sweden) according to the Henley Passport Index.
According to the World Tourism Organization 2016 report, the Danish passport is first in the world (tied with Finland, Germany, Italy, Luxembourg, Singapore, and the United Kingdom) in terms of travel freedom, with the mobility index of 160 (out of 215 with no visa weighted by 1, visa on arrival weighted by 0.7, eVisa by 0.5 and traditional visa weighted by 0).

As a member state of the European Union, Danish citizens enjoy freedom of movement within the European Economic Area (EEA). The Citizens’ Rights Directive defines the right of free movement for citizens of the EEA. Through bilateral agreements freedom of movement is extended to Switzerland, and all EU and EFTA nationals are not only visa-exempt but are legally entitled to enter and reside in each other's countries.

Controversy
In 2010, an atheist Danish citizen filed a complaint to the Danish Ministry of Justice, due to the passport's inclusion of a picture of the crucifixion of Jesus as shown on the Jelling Stones, arguing that passports should be free of religious symbols. This argument was rejected by leading Danish politicians, arguing that Christianity is a part of Denmark's cultural history, and Christianity was not depicted exclusively, since the passport also includes an image of a dragon motif, likewise taken from the largest Jelling Stone. The passport design including images from the Jelling Stones was introduced in 1997, when the current red design was introduced. Previous Danish passports had been green or beige.

Lack of national identity card
EU rules allow any citizen of a member country to travel anywhere in the EU without a passport, if they have a national identity card stating citizenship and some other standardised information. Denmark and Ireland are the only EU countries that do not issue national identity cards; however, Ireland issues passport cards which are treated by law as ID cards by some EU countries. Therefore, Denmark is the only country in the EU whose citizens cannot travel to other nations with ID cards or equivalents. There has been some political support for introducing such cards since the EU rule was introduced, but this has not yet become a reality.

See also

 Visa requirements for Danish citizens
 Passports of the European Union
 Danish nationality law
 Visa policy of the Schengen Area
 Identity document#Denmark

External links
European Community Passport (1989 — 1999) Description and images.

References

Denmark
European Union passports